This is a list of epic poems.

Ancient epics (to 500)

Before the 8th century BC
Epic of Gilgamesh  (Mesopotamian religion)
Epic of Lugalbanda (including Lugalbanda in the Mountain Cave and Lugalbanda and the Anzud Bird, Mesopotamian religion)
Epic of Enmerkar (including Enmerkar and the Lord of Aratta and Enmerkar and En-suhgir-ana, Mesopotamian religion)
Atrahasis  (Mesopotamian religion)
Enuma Elish (Babylonian religion)
The Descent of Inanna into the Underworld (Mesopotamian religion)
Legend of Keret (Ugaritic religion)

8th to 6th century BC
Iliad, ascribed to Homer  (Greek mythology)
Odyssey, ascribed to Homer  (Greek mythology)
Works and Days, ascribed to Hesiod  (Greek mythology)
Theogony, ascribed to Hesiod  (Greek mythology)
Shield of Heracles, ascribed to Hesiod  (Greek mythology)
Catalogue of Women, ascribed to Hesiod  (Greek mythology; only fragments survive)
Cypria, Aethiopis, Little Iliad, Iliupersis, Nostoi and Telegony, forming the so-called Epic Cycle (only fragments survive)
Oedipodea, Thebaid, Epigoni and Alcmeonis, forming the so-called Theban Cycle (only fragments survive)
A series of poems ascribed to Hesiod during antiquity (of which only fragments survive): Aegimius (alternatively ascribed to Cercops of Miletus), Astronomia, Descent of Perithous, Idaean Dactyls (almost completely lost), Megala Erga, Megalai Ehoiai, Melampodia and Wedding of Ceyx
Capture of Oechalia, ascribed to Homer or Creophylus of Samos during antiquity (only a fragment survives)
Phocais, ascribed to Homer during antiquity (only a fragment survives)
Titanomachy ascribed to Eumelus of Corinth (only a fragment survives)
Danais (written by one of the cyclic poets and from which the Danaid tetralogy of Aeschylus draws its material), Minyas and Naupactia, almost completely lost

5th to 4th century BC
Heracleia, tells of the labors of Heracles, almost completely lost, written by Panyassis (Greek mythology)
Mahābhārata, ascribed to Veda Vyasa  (Indian religion)
Ramayana, ascribed to Valmiki  (Indian religion)

3rd century BC
Argonautica by Apollonius of Rhodes (Greek mythology)

2nd century BC
Annales by Ennius (Roman history; only fragments survive)

1st century BC
De rerum natura by Lucretius (natural philosophy) 
Georgics by Virgil (didactic poem) 
Aeneid by Virgil  (Roman religion)

1st century AD
Metamorphoses by Ovid  (Greek and Roman mythology)
Pharsalia by Lucan  (Roman history; unfinished)
Argonautica by Gaius Valerius Flaccus (Roman poet, Greek mythology; incomplete)
Punica by Silius Italicus  (Roman history)
Thebaid and Achilleid by Statius  (Roman poet, Greek mythology; latter poem incomplete)

2nd century
Buddhacarita by Aśvaghoṣa  (Indian epic poetry)

2nd to 5th century
Cento Vergilianus de laudibus Christi by Faltonia Betitia Proba
The Five Great Epics of Tamil Literature: Cilappatikāram, Manimekalai, Cīvaka Cintāmaṇi, Valayapathi, Kundalakēci

3rd to 4th century
Posthomerica by Quintus of Smyrna (Greek mythology)
De raptu Proserpinae by Claudian (Roman poet, Greek mythology; incomplete)

4th century
Kumārasambhava by Kālidāsa  (Indian epic poetry)
Raghuvaṃśa by Kālidāsa (Indian epic poetry)
Blemyomachia (Greek, only fragments survive)

5th century
Argonautica Orphica by Anonymous (Greek mythology)
Dionysiaca by Nonnus (Greek mythology)
Mahavamsa, written in Pali
Yadegar-e Zariran, written in Middle Persian

Medieval epics (500–1500)

6th century
Iohannis by Corippus, Latin epic on the Byzantine conquest of North Africa

7th century
Táin Bó Cúailnge (Old Irish)
Bhaṭṭikāvya, Sanskrit courtly epic based on the Rāmāyaṇa and the Aṣṭādhyāyī of Pāṇini
Kiratarjuniya by Bharavi, Sanskrit epic based on an episode in the Mahabharata
Shishupala Vadha by Magha, Sanskrit epic based on another episode in the Mahabharata

8th to 10th century
Beowulf (Old English)
Waldere, Old English version of the story told in Waltharius (below), known only as a brief fragment
Alpamysh, a Turkic epic
Karolus magnus et Leo papa (Carolingian, Latin, before 814)
Daredevils of Sassoun (Armenian)
Bhagavata Purana (Sanskrit) "Stories of the Lord", based on earlier sources
Lay of Hildebrand and Muspilli (Old High German, c.870)
Kakawin Ramayana, Javanese version of the Ramayana (c. 870)
Shahnameh (Persian literature; details Persian legend and history from prehistoric times to the fall of the Sassanid Empire, by Ferdowsi)
Waltharius by Ekkehard of St. Gall (Germany, Latin); about Walter of Aquitaine
Poetic Edda (no particular authorship; oral tradition of the North Germanic peoples)
Vikramarjuna Vijaya and Ādi purāṇa (c. 941), Kannada poems by Adikavi Pampa
Ajitha Purana and Gadaayuddha (c.993 and c.999), Kannada poems by Ranna
Neelakesi (Tamil Jain epic)

11th century

Taghribat Bani Hilal (Arabic); see also Arabic epic literature
Ruodlieb (Latin), by a German author
Digenis Akritas (Greek); about a hero of the Byzantine Empire
Epic of King Gesar (Tibetan)
Garshaspname (Persian) by Asadi Tusi (1066)
Carmen Campidoctoris, the first poem about El Cid (c. 1083)
Song of Armouris (Byzantine, acritic song)
Borzu Nama, ascribed to 'Amid Abu'l 'Ala' 'Ata b. Yaqub Kateb Razi (Persian epic with a main character and a poetic style related to the "Shahnameh")
Faramarz Nama (Persian epic with a main character and a poetic style related to the "Shahnameh")
Mushika-vamsha (Sanskrit) by Atula
The Song of Roland (Old French)

12th century
Khamba Thoibi (Manipuri Epic by Hijam Anganghal)
Acallam na Senórach (Middle Irish)
The Knight in the Panther's Skin (Georgian) by Shota Rustaveli
Alexandreis by Walter of Châtillon (Latin)
De bello Troiano and the lost Antiocheis (Latin) by Joseph of Exeter
Carmen de Prodicione Guenonis, version of the story of the Song of Roland in Latin
Architrenius by John of Hauville, (Latin satire)
Liber ad honorem Augusti by Peter of Eboli, narrative of the conquest of Sicily by Henry VI, Holy Roman Emperor (Latin)
The Tale of Igor's Campaign and Bylinas (Old east slavic) (11th–19th centuries)
Gita Govinda (Sanskrit) by Jayadeva
Naishadha Charita (Sanskrit) by Sriharsha
Parishishtaparvan (Sanskrit) by Hemachandra
Prithviraja Vijaya (Sanskrit) by Jayanaka (1191–1192)
Roman de Troie by Benoît de Sainte-Maure (Old French)
Roman de Brut and Roman de Rou by Wace  (Old French)
Poem of Almería (Latin)
Eupolemius (Latin) by an anonymous German-speaking author
Bahman Nama and Kush Nama (Persian) ascribed to Hakim Īrānšāh b. Abi'l Khayr
Banu Goshasp Nama (Persian)
Ramavataram (Tamil) by Kambar, based on the "Ramayana"
Cycle of the First Crusade (Old French) by Graindor de Douai and others

13th century
Nibelungenlied (Middle High German)
Kudrun (Middle High German)
Daniel von dem blühenden Tal (Middle High German)
Brut by Layamon (Early Middle English)
Chanson de la Croisade Albigeoise ("Song of the Albigensian Crusade"; Old Occitan)
Antar (Arabic); see also Arabic epic literature
Sirat al-Zahir Baibars (Arabic); see also Arabic epic literature
Osman's Dream (Ottoman Turkish)
Epic of Sundiata (Malinke People)
El Cantar de Mio Cid, Spanish epic of the Reconquista (Old Spanish)
De triumphis ecclesiae by Johannes de Garlandia (Latin)
Gesta Regum Britanniae by William of Rennes (Latin)
Van den vos Reynaerde (Middle Dutch)
Poema de Fernán González, cantar de gesta by a monk of San Pedro de Arlanza; 1250–1266 (Old Spanish)
Jewang ungi by Yi Seung-hyu ("Rhymed Chronicles of Sovereigns"; 1287 Korea)
Basava purana by Palkuriki Somanatha (Telugu)
Jahangirnameh by Qāsem-e Mādeḥ (largely an imitation of the Borzu Nama)

14th century 
Divine Comedy (Christian mythology) by Dante Alighieri
Cursor Mundi (Middle English) by an anonymous cleric (c. 1300)
Africa by Petrarch (Latin)
The Tale of the Heike, Japanese epic war tale
The Brus by John Barbour (Scots)
La Spagna (Italian) attributed to Sostegno di Zanobi (c. 1350–1360)
Mocedades de Rodrigo (Old Spanish) (c. 1360)
Siege of Jerusalem (c. 1370–1380, Middle English)
Troilus and Criseyde (Middle English) by Geoffrey Chaucer (c.1380)
Zafarnamah (Persian) by Hamdollah Mostowfi

15th century
Canterbury Tales by Geoffrey Chaucer
Hammira Mahakavya by Nayachandra Suri (Sanskrit)
Yuan Phai by Royal Poets of King Borommatrai-lokkanat (c. 1475)
Mahachat Kham luang a Siamese retelling of Vessantara Jataka by Royal Poets of King Borommatrai-lokkanat (1492)
Orlando innamorato (Italian) by Matteo Maria Boiardo (1495)
Shmuel-Bukh (Old Yiddish chivalry romance based on the Biblical book of Samuel)
Mlokhim-Bukh (Old Yiddish epic poem based on the Biblical Books of Kings)
Book of Dede Korkut (Oghuz Turks)
Morgante (Italian) by Luigi Pulci (1485), with elements typical of the mock-heroic genre
The Wallace by Blind Harry (Scots chivalric poem)
Troy Book by John Lydgate, about the Trojan war (Middle English)
Heldenbuch (Middle High German) a group of manuscripts and prints of the 15th and 16th centuries, typically including material from the Theodoric cycle and the cycle of Hugdietrich, Wolfdietrich and Ortnit
Ibong Adarna (Filipino) whose real author is not known

Modern epics (from 1500)

16th century
Lilit Phra Lo by King Ramathibodi II (–1529)
Judita (Croatian) by Marko Marulić (1501)
Ismailnameh an epic poem on shah Ismail I heroic deeds by Qsimi Qunabadi nephew of Hatifi (1513)
Orlando Furioso (Italian) by Ludovico Ariosto (1516)
Theuerdank and Weisskunig (Weisskunig only got published in 1775) by Maximilian I and Marx Treitzsaurwein, often considered the last medieval epics.
Davidiad (Latin) by Marko Marulić (1517)
Christiad (Latin) by Marco Girolamo Vida (1535)
Padmavat (Hindustani) by Malik Muhammad Jayasi (1540)
Süleymanname by Arifi çelebi
Sang Sinxay, the most famous epic poem of Laos, was written around mid sixteenth century.
Franciade (French) by Pierre de Ronsard (1540s–1572)
Os Lusíadas by Luís de Camões
L'Amadigi by Bernardo Tasso (1560)
La Araucana by Alonso de Ercilla y Zúñiga (1569–1589)
La Gerusalemme liberata by Torquato Tasso (1575)
Ramacharitamanasa (based on the Ramayana) by Goswami Tulsidas (1577)
The Faerie Queene (Early Modern English) by Edmund Spenser (1596)
Venus and Adonis (1593) and Lucrece (1594) (Early Modern English) by Shakespeare
The Dam San of the Ede people (now in Vietnam) is often considered to appear in the 16th or 17th century.

17th century
La Argentina by Martín del Barco Centenera (1602)
La Cleopatra by Girolamo Graziani (1632)
Biag ni Lam-ang by Pedro Bucaneg (1640)
Il Conquisto di Granata by Girolamo Graziani (1650)
Exact Epitome of the Four Monarchies by Anne Bradstreet (1650)
Szigeti veszedelem, also known under the Latin title Obsidionis Szigetianae, a Hungarian epic by Miklós Zrínyi (1651)
Gondibert by William Davenant (1651)
Paradise Lost (1667)(Christian mythology) and Paradise Regained (1671) by John Milton
Khun Chang Khun Phaen, a Thai epic poem by anonymous folk poets (–1700)

18th century
 Kumulipo by Keaulumoku (1700), an Ancient Hawaiian cosmogonic genealogy first published in 1889
 Telemachus by Anna Seward (epic re-telling of François Fénelon's Les Aventures de Télémaque)
 Henriade by Voltaire (1723)
 Utendi wa Tambuka by Bwana Mwengo (1728)
 Der Messias by Friedrich Gottlieb Klopstock (1748–1773)
 La Pucelle d'Orléans by Voltaire (1756)
 Poems of Ossian by James Macpherson (1760–1765)
 The Seasons by Kristijonas Donelaitis (1765–1775)
 O Uraguai by Basílio da Gama (1769)
 Caoineadh Airt Uí Laoghaire by Eibhlín Dubh Ní Chonaill (1773)
 O Desertor das Letras by Silva Alvarenga (1774), a short mock-heroic epic
 Caramuru by Santa Rita Durão (1781)
 Joan of Arc by Robert Southey (1796)
 Hermann and Dorothea by Johann Wolfgang von Goethe (1797)

19th century
The Tale of Kiều by Nguyễn Du (c. 1800)
Thalaba the Destroyer by Robert Southey (1801)
Madoc by Robert Southey (1805)
Psyche by Mary Tighe (1805)
The Columbiad by Joel Barlow (1807)
Milton: A Poem by William Blake (1804–1810)
Marmion by Walter Scott (1808)
Alipashiad by Haxhi Shehreti (before 1817)
Childe Harold's Pilgrimage by Lord Byron, narrating the travels of Childe Harold (1812–1818)
Queen Mab by Percy Bysshe Shelley (1813)
Roderick the Last of the Goths by Robert Southey (1814)
The Lord of the Isles by Walter Scott (1813)
Alastor, or The Spirit of Solitude by Percy Bysshe Shelley (1815)
The Revolt of Islam (Laon and Cyntha) by Percy Bysshe Shelley (1817)
Harold the Dauntless by Walter Scott (1817)
Manuscripts of Dvůr Králové and Zelená Hora, forged epic published in 1818
Endymion (1818) by John Keats
Hyperion (1818) and The Fall of Hyperion (1819) by John Keats
The Battle of Marathon by Elizabeth Barrett Browning (1820)
Phra Aphai Mani by Sunthorn Phu (1821 or 1822–1844)
Don Juan by Lord Byron (1824), an example of a "mock" epic in that it parodies the epic style of the author's predecessors
Camões by Almeida Garrett (1825), narrating the last years and deeds of Luís de Camões
Dona Branca by Almeida Garrett (1826), the fantastic tale of the forbidden love between Portuguese princess Branca and Moorish king Aben-Afan
Tamerlane by Edgar Allan Poe (1827)
The Gypsies (poem) by Alexander Pushkin (1827)
The Free Besieged by Dionysios Solomos (1828–1851)
The Fall of Nineveh by Edwin Atherstone (1828–1868)
Creation, Man and the Messiah by Henrik Wergeland (1829)
The Bronze Horseman by Alexander Pushkin (1833)
Prometheus Bound by Aeschylus, translated by Elizabeth Barrett Browning (1833)
Messiah's Kingdom by Agnes Bulmer (1833)
Pan Tadeusz by Adam Mickiewicz (1834)
The Baptism on the Savica (Krst pri Savici) by France Prešeren (1836)
Florante at Laura, an awit by Francisco Balagtas (1838)
King Alfred by John Fitchett (completed by Robert Roscoe and published in 1841–1842)
Horatius by Thomas Babington Macaulay (1842)
Germany. A Winter's Tale by Heinrich Heine (1843), a "mock" epic
János Vitéz by Sándor Petőfi (1845)
Smrt Smail-age Čengića by Ivan Mažuranić (1846)
Toldi (1846), Toldi szerelme ("Toldi's Love", 1879) and Toldi estéje ("Toldi's Night", 1848) by János Arany, forming the so-called "Toldi trilogy"
Evangeline by Henry Wadsworth Longfellow (1847)
The Mountain Wreath by Petar II Petrović-Njegoš (1847)
The Tales of Ensign Stål by Johan Ludvig Runeberg (first part published in 1848, second part published in 1860)
Kalevala by Elias Lönnrot (1849 Finnish mythology)
I-Juca-Pirama (1851) by Gonçalves Dias
Kalevipoeg by Friedrich Reinhold Kreutzwald (1853; Estonian mythology)
The Prelude by William Wordsworth
Song of Myself by Walt Whitman (1855)
The Song of Hiawatha by Henry Wadsworth Longfellow (1855)
A Confederação dos Tamoios by Gonçalves de Magalhães (1856)
The Saga of King Olaf by Henry Wadsworth Longfellow (1856–1863)
Aurora Leigh by Elizabeth Barrett Browning (1857)
Os Timbiras by Gonçalves Dias (1857)
Meghnad Badh Kavya by Michael Madhusudan Dutta (1861)
Terje Vigen by Henrik Ibsen (1862)
La Légende des siècles (The Legend of the Centuries) by Victor Hugo (1859–1877)
The Earthly Paradise by William Morris (1868–1870)
Ibonia, oral epic of Madagascar (first transcription: 1870)
Martín Fierro by José Hernández (1872)
Idylls of the King by Alfred Tennyson (c. 1874)
Clarel by Herman Melville (1876)
The Story of Sigurd the Volsung and the Fall of the Niblungs by William Morris (1876)
L'Atlàntida by Jacint Verdaguer (1877)
The Light of Asia by Edwin Arnold (1879)
The City of Dreadful Night by Bysshe Vanolis (finished in 1874, published in 1880)
Tristram of Lyonesse by Algernon Charles Swinburne (1882)
Eros and Psyche by Robert Bridges (1885)
La Fin de Satan by Victor Hugo (written between 1855 and 1860, published in 1886)
Canigó by Jacint Verdaguer (1886)
Lāčplēsis ('The Bear-Slayer') by Andrejs Pumpurs (1888; Latvian Mythology)
Tabaré by Juan Zorrilla de San Martín (1888; national epic of Uruguay)
The Wanderings of Oisin by William Butler Yeats (1889)
Kotan Utunnai, Ainu epic, recorded in the 1880s, published in 1890
Host and Guest by Vazha-Pshavela (1893)
The 9th of July 1821 by Vasilis Michaelides (1893–1895; national epic of Cyprus written in Cypriot Greek)
The Tale of Balen by Algernon Charles Swinburne (1896)
Lục Vân Tiên by Nguyễn Đình Chiểu
Amir Arsalan, narrated by Mohammad Ali Naqib al-Mamalek to the Qajar Shah of Persia

20th century
The Divine Enchantment by John Neihardt (1900)
Lahuta e Malcís by Gjergj Fishta (composed 1902–1937)
Ural-batyr (Bashkirs oral tradition set in the written form by Mukhamedsha Burangulov in 1910)
The Ballad of the White Horse by G. K. Chesterton (1911)
Mensagem by Fernando Pessoa (composed 1913–1934)
The Cantos by Ezra Pound (composed 1915–1969)
Dorvyzhy, Udmurt national epic compiled in Russian by Mikhail Khudiakov (1920) basing on folklore works
The Legend of Sigurd and Gudrún by J. R. R. Tolkien (composed 1920–1939, published 2009)
A Cycle of the West by John Neihardt (composed 1921–1949)
The Odyssey: A Modern Sequel by Nikos Kazantzakis (Greek verse, composed 1924–1938)
Dymer by C. S. Lewis (1926)
"A" by Louis Zukofsky (composed 1927–1978)
John Brown's Body by Stephen Vincent Benét (1928)
The Fall of Arthur by J. R. R. Tolkien (composed –1934, published 2013)
The Bridge by Hart Crane (1930)
Ariadne by F. L. Lucas (1932)
Kamayani by Jaishankar Prasad (1936)
The People, Yes by Carl Sandburg (1936)
In Parenthesis by David Jones (1937)
Canto General by Pablo Neruda (1938–1950)
Khamba Thoibi Sheireng (based on Khamba and Thoibi) by Hijam Anganghal (1940) 
Paterson by William Carlos Williams (composed –1961)
Sugata Saurabha by Chittadhar Hridaya (1941–1945)
Victory for the Slain by Hugh John Lofting (1942)
The Great South Land: An Epic Poem (1951) by Rex Ingamells
Rashmirathi (1952), Hunkar by Ramdhari Singh Dinkar
Savitri by Aurobindo Ghose (1950)
The Maximus Poems by Charles Olson (composed 1950–1970)
The Anathemata by David Jones (1952)
Aniara by Harry Martinson (composed 1956)
Helen in Egypt by H.D. (1961)
Song of Lawino by Okot p'Bitek (1966)
Puerto Rican Obituary by Pedro Pietri (1971)
Prussian Nights by Alexander Solzhenitsyn (1974)
The Banner of Joan by H. Warner Munn (1975)
Kristubhagavatam by P. C. Devassia (1976)
Keralodayam Mahakavyam by K. N. Ezhuthachan (1977)
The Changing Light at Sandover by James Merrill (composed 1976–1982)
The Battlefield Where The Moon Says I Love You by Frank Stanford (published 1977)
Emperor Shaka the Great by Mazisi Kunene (1979)
The Lay of the Children of Húrin and The Lay of Leithian by J. R. R. Tolkien (published 1985)
The New World by Frederick Turner (1985)
Empire of Dreams by Giannina Braschi (1988)
Omeros by Derek Walcott (1990)
Genesis by Frederick Turner (1990)
Arundhati by Jagadguru Rambhadracharya (1994)
Mastorava by A. M. Sharonov (1994)
Astronautilía Hvězdoplavba by Jan Křesadlo (1995)
The Descent of Alette by Alice Notley (1996)
The Alamo: An Epic by Michael Lind (1997)
Fredy Neptune: A Novel in Verse by Les Murray (1998)

21st century
Sribhargavaraghaviyam (2002), Ashtavakra (2009) and Gitaramayanam (2009–2010, published in 2011) by Jagadguru Rambhadracharya
Solaris korrigert by Øyvind Rimbereid (2004)
Apocalypse by Frederick Turner (published 2016)
Lime Stone: An Epic Poem of Barbados (2008) by Anthony Kellman
Zorgamazoo by Robert Paul Weston (published 2008)

Other epics 

Canaäd, an epic poem reconstructing Canaanite mythology, set during the Late Bronze Age. 
Epic of Bamana Segu, oral epic of the Bambara people, composed in the 19th century and recorded in the 20th century
Epic of Darkness, tales and legends of primeval China
Epic of Jangar, poem of the Oirat people
Epic of Köroğlu, Turkic oral tradition written down mostly in 18th century
Epic of Manas (18th century)
Epic of the Forgotten, Bulgarian poetic saga
Gesta Berengarii imperatoris
Hikayat Seri Rama, Malay version of the Ramayana
Hinilawod, Filipino epic from the island of Panay
Hotsuma Tsutae
Khun Chang Khun Phaen, a Thai poem
Klei Khan Y Dam San, a Vietnamese poem
Koti and Chennayya and Epic of Siri, Tulu poems
Kutune Shirka, sacred yukar epic of the Ainu people of which several translations exist
Mu'allaqat, Arabic poems written by seven poets in Classical Arabic, these poems are very similar to epic poems and specially the poem of Antarah ibn Shaddad
Parsifal by Richard Wagner (opera, composed 1880–1882)
Pasyón, Filipino religious epic, of which the 1703 and 1814 versions are popular
Popol Vuh, history of the K'iche' people 
Ramakien, Thailand's national epic derived from the Ramayana
Der Ring des Nibelungen by Richard Wagner (opera, composed 1848–1874)
Siribhoovalaya, a unique work of multi-lingual literature written by Kumudendu Muni, a Jain monk
Yadegar-e Zariran (Middle Persian)
Yama Zatdaw, Burmese version of the Ramayana

References
12. https://www.rokomari.com/book/213367/nabinama

Epic